Murugan Thiruchelvam (born 11 December 1988), of Sri Lankan descent, is an English chess player. He was England's youngest player ever to gain an international chess rating (2020 at the age of nine).

Having just passed his tenth birthday, he played against the then world champion Garry Kasparov in a simultaneous exhibition. Impressed by the strategic understanding of the youngster, Kasparov singled out the game as the best of that day.

Murugan continued to improve rapidly, reaching 2269 Elo on FIDE's published rating list before age twelve. Thereafter, he played only infrequently and by 2003 was no longer participating in FIDE rated events.

References

Bibliography

External links

1989 births
Living people
English chess players
Place of birth missing (living people)
English people of Sri Lankan Tamil descent